We Should Have Gone To University is the 2009 three-disc compilation album by the Alternative rock group Reuben. It collects b-sides, rarities and videos from the band over the course of their career.

Track listing

Disc Three (DVD content)

Music Videos
"Wooden Boy"
"Scared of the Police"
"Stux"
"Let's Stop Hanging Out"
"Stuck in My Throat"
"Freddy Kreuger"
"Moving To Blackwater"
"Blamethrower"
"A Kick in the Mouth"
"Keep It To Yourself"
"Blood Bunny Larkhall"
"Deadly Lethal Ninja Assassin"
"Cities on Fire"
"Christmas Is Awesome"
"Blitzkrieg"

Download '07
Reuben's set on the main stage at Download Festival 2007.

In The Studio
The band record material, including Lissom Slo, at Jacob's Studio in Farnham.

Europe Tour
A video diary of their European tour with Billy Talent.

Reuben Talk To Designer Magazine
The band are interviewed whilst on tour.

Miscellanea
Due to a double-tracking technique used to record "Catch", the guitars may cancel each other out when it is played on some stereos. If this occurs, the CD case suggests that the track should be called "Catch (Amazing special rare 'no guitars' mix)".

The final track, "The Last Time", was not meant to be about the band at the time of recording.

Personnel
Jamie Lenman – Guitars, vocals, piano
Jon Pearce – Bass, vocals
Guy Davis – Drums, vocals

References

Reuben (band) albums
2009 compilation albums